This is a list of commemorative coins issued by the Central Bank of Russia in 1993:

References

1993
Commemorative coins